The 2015–16 season is Partick Thistle's third season in the Scottish Premiership, having been promoted from the Scottish First Division at the end of the 2012–13 season. Partick Thistle will also compete in the League Cup and the Scottish Cup.

Results & fixtures

Scottish Premiership

Scottish League Cup

Scottish Cup

Squad statistics
During the 2015–16 season, Partick Thistle have used twenty-five different players in competitive games. The table below shows the number of appearances and goals scored by each player.

Appearances

|}

Disciplinary record

Team statistics

League table

Division summary

Management statistics
Last updated on 14 May 2016

Transfers

In

Out

See also
 List of Partick Thistle F.C. seasons

Notes

References

Partick Thistle
Partick Thistle F.C. seasons